Lee Jeong-soon (born 23 February 1961) is a South Korean former professional tennis player.

Biography
Lee competed on the professional tour in the 1980s, which included a main draw appearance at the 1984 Santista Textile Open, a Virginia Slim tournament held in Rio de Janeiro. She made it through to the second round, where she was beaten by a 14-year old Gabriela Sabatini.

From 1984 to 1986 she featured in 12 ties for the South Korea Federation Cup team. During her Federation Cup career she registered seven singles wins, including victories over Argentina's Mercedes Paz and Brazil's Patricia Medrado.

At the 1986 Asian Games in Seoul, Lee won a total of four medals for South Korea, one of them a mixed doubles gold partnering Yoo Jin-sun.

ITF finals

Singles (3–2)

Doubles (4–2)

References

External links
 
 
 

1961 births
Living people
South Korean female tennis players
Asian Games medalists in tennis
Asian Games gold medalists for South Korea
Asian Games silver medalists for South Korea
Medalists at the 1986 Asian Games
Tennis players at the 1986 Asian Games
20th-century South Korean women